A Life for a Life may refer to:
 A Life for a Life (1916 film)
 A Life for a Life (1910 film)